In algebraic geometry, a functor represented by a scheme X is a set-valued contravariant functor on the category of schemes such that the value of the functor at each scheme S is (up to natural bijections) the set of all morphisms . The scheme X is then said to represent the functor and that classify geometric objects over S given by F.

In some applications, it may not be possible to find a scheme that represents a given functor. This led to the notion of a stack, which is not quite a functor but can still be treated as if it were a geometric space. (A Hilbert scheme is a scheme, but not a stack because, very roughly speaking, deformation theory is simpler for closed schemes.)

Some moduli problems are solved by giving formal solutions (as opposed to polynomial algebraic solutions) and in that case, the resulting functor is represented by a formal scheme. Such a formal scheme is then said to be algebraizable if there is another scheme that can represent the same functor, up to some isomorphisms.

Motivation 

The notion is an analog of a classifying space in algebraic topology. In other words, to give a principal G-bundle over a space S is the same as to give a map (called a classifying map) from a space S to the classifying space  of G.

A similar phenomenon in algebraic geometry is given by a linear system: to give a morphism from a projective variety to a projective space is (up to base loci) to give a linear system on the projective variety.

Yoneda's lemma says that a scheme X determines and is determined by its points.

Functor of points 

Let X be a scheme. Its functor of points is the functor

Hom(−,X) : (Affine schemes)op ⟶ Sets

sending an affine scheme Y to the set of scheme maps .

A scheme is determined up to isomorphism by its functor of points. This is a stronger version of the Yoneda lemma, which says that a X is determined by the map Hom(−,X):Schemesop → Sets.

Conversely, a functor F:(Affine schemes)op → Sets is the functor of points of some scheme if and only if F is a sheaf with respect to the Zariski topology on (Affine schemes), and F admits an open cover by affine schemes.

Examples

Points as characters 
Let X be a scheme over the base ring B. If x is a set-theoretic point of X, then the residue field of x is the residue field of the local ring  (i.e., the quotient by the maximal ideal). For example, if X is an affine scheme Spec(A) and x is a prime ideal , then the residue field of x is the function field of the closed subscheme .

For simplicity, suppose . Then the inclusion of a set-theoretic point x into X corresponds to the ring homomorphism:

(which is  if .)

Points as sections 
By the universal property of fiber product, each R-point of a scheme X determines a morphism of R-schemes
;
i.e., a section of the projection . If S is a subset of X(R), then one writes  for the set of the images of the sections determined by elements in S.

Spec of the ring of dual numbers 
Let , the Spec of the ring of dual numbers over a field k and X a scheme over k. Then each  amounts to the tangent vector to X at the point that is the image of the closed point of the map. In other words,  is the set of tangent vectors to X.

Universal object 

Let F be the functor represented by a scheme X. Under the isomorphism , there is a unique element of  that corresponds to the identity map . It is called the universal object or the universal family (when the objects that are being classified are families).

See also 
Weil restriction
Rational point
descent along torsors.

Notes

References

External links 
http://www.math.washington.edu/~zhang/Shanghai2011/Slides/ardakov.pdf

Algebraic geometry